Vermont elected its members September 5, 1826.  It required a majority for election, which was not met on the first vote in two districts, requiring additional elections held December 4, 1826 and February 5, 1827.

See also 
 1826 and 1827 United States House of Representatives elections
 List of United States representatives from Vermont

United States House of Representatives elections in Vermont
Vermont
Vermont
United States House of Representatives
United States House of Representatives